The Famous Adventures of Mr. Magoo is an American animated television series produced by United Productions of America that aired for one season on NBC from September 19, 1964 to April 24, 1965. The television series was based on the original cartoon of the same name, with Jim Backus reprising the voiceover of the role he did on TV: while doing this show, he continued with the prime time TV show Gilligan's Island. This was a follow-up to the original Mister Magoo series which aired from 1960-1961.

Unlike the theatrical cartoons, which focused on the extremely nearsighted Quincy Magoo's bumbling, the show featured the Magoo character as an actor in adaptations of such literary classics as Don Quixote and "Gunga Din". Each of these roles was played seriously, with few if any references to Magoo's nearsightedness; however, introductory segments in each program featured Magoo backstage stumbling into scenery and talking to props, thus connecting the older cartoons to this series. Some stories were contained in a single half-hour episode, but others ran for two and even four episodes. As UPA did not have its own studio facility, the production was farmed out to the Grantray-Lawrence and Format Films studios.

Among the most ambitious adaptations mounted in this format were the four-part Robin Hood, in which he took the role of Friar Tuck; Treasure Island, in which he played the villainous Long John Silver; and a version of Snow White in which he portrayed all seven of the Seven Dwarfs (much easier in an animated setting, with no trick photography needed).

The series was inspired by the success of the 1962 television special Mister Magoo's Christmas Carol, a serious remake of the Charles Dickens classic novel with Magoo playing Ebenezer Scrooge.

The series was re-shown in the early 1970s on early Saturday mornings and the early 1980s as part of certain channels' weekday afternoon cartoon blocs. Certain episodes were released on VHS, but these have since gone out of print.

The series was originally shown in prime time and not as part of an animated block for juvenile viewers; therefore, certain more mature elements were present. These included death threats (William Tell, Robin Hood, Don Quixote, The Three Musketeers, Sherlock Holmes), children in danger (Treasure Island, Gunga Din, William Tell), insanity (Don Quixote, Moby Dick), heroic self-sacrifice (Gunga Din), religious themes (Noah's Ark), and realistic, although mostly bloodless, violence; including swordplay, shooting, clubbing, drowning and character deaths in most of the episodes.

Episodes

Home video
In November 2011, Shout! Factory released Mr. Magoo: The Television Collection 1960-1977 on DVD in Region 1. This 11-disc collection contains all the episodes from all three Mr. Magoo television series, including all 26 episodes of The Famous Adventures of Mr. Magoo.

References

External links
 

1960s American animated television series
1964 American television series debuts
1965 American television series endings
American animated television spin-offs
American children's animated comedy television series
Mr. Magoo
English-language television shows
NBC original programming